No Doubt is the debut studio album from American R&B group 702. It was released by Biv 10 Records on October 8, 1996, while distribution was helmed by Motown. The album peaked at number 82 on the US Billboard 200. By November 1997, it was certified Gold in sales by the Recording Industry Association of America (RIAA), after sales reached 500,000 copies in the United States.

Critical reception

Stephen Thomas Erlewine of Allmusic gave No Doubt a mixed review, remarking that it "has a couple of fine moments," but that the group's "fusion of street-oriented rap and urban soul doesn't quite gel over the course of the album."

Chart performance
The album peaked at eighty-two on the US Billboard 200 and reached the twenty-fourth spot on the Top R&B/Hip-Hop Albums chart. The album was certified gold in November 1997.

Track listing

Notes
 denotes co-producer
 denotes additional producer

Personnel
Information taken from Allmusic.
a&r – Lisa Smith Craig
administration – Steve Cook
assistant engineering – Dave Hancock
cover photo – Daniela Federici
design – David Harley
drum programming – Chad "Dr. Seuss" Elliott, Charles Farrar, Rashad Smith, Terry Williams
engineering – Brandon Abeln, T-Bone Demmar, Donell Jones, Moise Laporte, Kevin McKenzie, Appolon "Chap" Noel, Eliud "Lou" Ortiz, Mario Rodriquez, Kevin Thomas
executive chief – André Harrell
executive producer – Todd Russaw
hair stylist – Rowan Eugene
keyboard programming – Terry Williams
keyboards – Chad "Dr. Seuss" Elliott, Troy Taylor
make-up – Nzínga
mastering – Chris Gehringer
mix engineering – Ben Garrison, Eliud "Lou" Ortiz, Mario Rodriquez, Kevin Thomas
mixing – Charles "Prince Charles" Alexander, David Dachinger, T-Bone Demmar, Chad "Dr. Seuss" Elliott, Ben Garrison, Eliud "Lou" Ortiz, Malik Pendleton, Mario Rodriquez, Todd Russaw, Rashad Smith, Kevin Thomas, Terry Williams
photography – Daniela Federici, Michael Lavine
production – Chad "Dr. Seuss" Elliott, Charles Farrar, Donell Jones, Kevin McKenzie, George R. "Golden Fingers" Pearson, Malik Pendleton, Poke, Rashad Smith, Troy Taylor, StarrStrukk, Terry Williams
programming – Kevin McKenzie
project manager – Daryle Lockhart
rapping – Shyheim
stylist – Takisha Olugbolagun, Takisha Oluhnolshun
tray photo – Michael Lavine
vocal arranging – Missy Elliott, Nicole Johnson, Malik Pendleton, Rashad Smith, Troy Taylor
vocals (background) – Mary Brown, Orish Grinstead

Charts

Certifications

References

External links
 

1996 debut albums
702 (group) albums
Albums produced by K-Cut (producer)
Albums produced by Missy Elliott
Albums produced by Rashad Smith
Albums produced by Trackmasters
Motown albums
Biv 10 Records albums